Teucrium fruticans (common name tree germander or shrubby germander) is a species of flowering plant in the mint family Lamiaceae, native to the western and central Mediterranean.

The Latin specific epithet fruticans means "shrubby" or "bushy".

The cultivar 'Azureum', with darker blue flowers, has gained the Royal Horticultural Society's Award of Garden Merit. It is hardy in milder areas, where temperatures do not fall below . It prefers the shelter of a wall, in full sun with neutral or alkaline soil.

References

fruticans
Plants described in 1753
Garden plants
Taxa named by Carl Linnaeus
Flora of Malta